The Lwów–Warsaw School was an interdisciplinary school  (mainly philosophy, logic and psychology) founded by Kazimierz Twardowski in 1895 in Lemberg, Austro-Hungary (now Lviv, Ukraine).

Though its members represented a variety of disciplines, from mathematics through logic to psychology, the Lwów–Warsaw School is widely considered to have been a philosophical movement. It has produced some of the leading logicians of the twentieth century such as Jan Łukasiewicz, Stanisław Leśniewski, and Alfred Tarski, among others. Its members did not only contribute to the techniques of logic but also to various domains that belong to the philosophy of language.

History

Polish philosophy and the Lwów–Warsaw school were considerably influenced by Franz Brentano and his pupils Kazimierz Twardowski, Anton Marty, Alexius Meinong, and Edmund Husserl. Twardowski founded the philosophical school when he became the chair of the Lviv University.

Principal topics of interest to the Lwów–Warsaw school included formal ontology, mereology, and universal or categorial grammar.

The Lwów-Warsaw School began as a general philosophical school but steadily moved toward logic. The Lwów–Warsaw school of logic lay at the origin of Polish logic and was closely associated with or was part of the Warsaw School of Mathematics. According to Jan Woleński, a decisive factor in the school's development was the view that the future of the Polish school of mathematics depended on the research connected with the new branches of the field such as set theory and topology, which are closely related to mathematical logic. The "philosophical branch" followed Twardowski's tradition and produced notable thinkers such as Bronisław Bandrowski, who addressed the problem of induction and Tadeusz Kotarbinski, who is known for developing Reism.

In the 1930s Alfred Tarski initiated contacts with the Vienna Circle. Tarski, the most prominent member of the Lwów–Warsaw School, has been ranked as one of the four greatest logicians of all time, along with Aristotle, Gottlob Frege, and Kurt Gödel.

The school's work was interrupted by the outbreak of World War II. Despite this, its members went on to fundamentally influence modern science, notably mathematics and logic, in the post-war period. Tarski's description of semantic truth, for instance, has revolutionized logic and philosophy.

In contemporary Polish learning, the philosopher Jan Woleński considers himself close to the School's heritage. In 2013 Woleński was awarded by the Foundation for Polish Science for his comprehensive analysis of the work of the Lwów–Warsaw school and for placing its achievements within the international discourse of contemporary analytic philosophy.

Members

Many of the School's members worked in more than one field.
 Kazimierz Ajdukiewicz
 Bronisław Bandrowski
 Leopold Blaustein
 Józef Maria Bocheński
 Leon Chwistek
 Tadeusz Czeżowski
 Eugénie Ginsberg
 Janina Hosiasson-Lindenbaum
 Stanisław Jaśkowski
 Maria Kokoszyńska-Lutmanowa
 Tadeusz Kotarbiński
 Czesław Lejewski
 Stanisław Leśniewski
 Jan Łukasiewicz
 Maria Ossowska
 Alfred Tarski
 Kazimierz Twardowski
 Władysław Witwicki
 Zygmunt Zawirski

See also
 History of philosophy in Poland
 Polish School of Mathematics
 School of Brentano

References

Bibliography
 Brożek, A., A. Chybińska, J. Jadacki, and Jan Woleński, eds., Tradition of the Lvov-Warsaw School. Ideas and Continuations, Leiden, Boston, 2015. 
 Brożek, A., F. Stadler, and Jan Woleński, eds., The Significance of the Lvov-Warsaw School in the European Culture, Wien, 2017. 
Coniglione, F., Polish Scientific Philosophy: The Lvov–Warsaw School, Amsterdam, Atlanta, 1993.
Drabarek, A., Jan Woleński, and M.M. Radzki, eds., Interdisciplinary investigations into the Lvov-Warsaw School, Cham, 2019.
 
Garrido, Á., and U. Wybraniec-Skardowska, eds., The Lvov-Warsaw School. Past and Present, Basel, 2018.
Jadacki, J.J., Polish Analytical Philosophy, Warsaw, 2009.
 Jadacki, J., and J. Paśniczek, eds., The Lvov-Warsaw School – The new generation, Poznań Studies in the Philosophy of Science and Humanities, vol. 89, Polish Analytical Philosophy, vol. VI, Amsterdam, Atlanta, 2006 .
 Jordan, Z., The Development of Mathematical Logic and of Logical Positivism in Poland between Two Wars, Oxford, 1945. 
Kijania-Place, K., and Jan Woleński, eds., The Lvov-Warsaw School and Contemporary Philosophy, Dordrecht, 1998. 
 Marion M., W. Miśkiewicz, S. Lapointe, and Jan Woleński, eds., The Golden Age of Polish Philosophy: Kazimierz Twardowski's Philosophical Legacy, Dordrecht, 2009 .
McFarland, A., J. McFarland, and J.T. Smith, eds., Alfred Tarski: Early Work in Poland – Geometry and Teaching, Basel, 2010.
Skolimowski, H., Polish Analytical Philosophy. London, 1967.
Smith, B., Austrian Philosophy, Chicago, 1994.
Szaniawski, Klemens, ed., The Vienna Circle and the Lvov–Warsaw School, Dordrecht, Boston, London, 1989.
Woleński, Jan, Logic and Philosophy in the Lvov–Warsaw School, Dordrecht, Boston, Lancaster, Reidel, 1989.

External links
 The Lvóv-Warsaw School, by Francesco Coniglione, in the Polish Philosophy Page.

 Archives of the Lvov-Warsaw School, multi-institutional initiative to digitize and research the manuscripts of Twardowski and the school members.

History of logic
History of education in Poland
History of Warsaw
History of Lviv
Philosophical schools and traditions